James W. "Jim" Gordon, Sr. is a fictional character appearing in American comic books published by DC Comics, most commonly in association with the superhero Batman. Created by Bill Finger and Bob Kane as an ally of Batman, the character debuted in the first panel of Detective Comics #27 (May 1939), Batman's first appearance, making him the first Batman supporting character ever to be introduced, eventually succeeding him as Batman from 2015 to 2016.

As the police commissioner of Gotham City, Gordon shares Batman's deep commitment to ridding the city of crime. The character is typically portrayed as having full trust in Batman and is even somewhat dependent on him. In many modern stories, he is somewhat skeptical of Batman's vigilante methods, but nevertheless believes that Gotham needs him. The two have a mutual respect and tacit friendship. Gordon is the father or adoptive father (depending on the continuity) of Barbara Gordon, the second Batgirl and the information broker Oracle. Jim Gordon also has a biological son, James Gordon Jr., a psychopathic serial killer who first appeared in Batman: Year One (as an infant).

One of Batman's most notable and enduring allies, Gordon has appeared in various forms of non-comics media; he has been voiced in animation and video games by Bob Hastings, Bryan Cranston, Jonathan Banks, and Christopher Meloni among others, and has been portrayed in live-action by Lyle Talbot in the Batman and Robin 1949 serial, Neil Hamilton in the 1960s Batman show and film, Pat Hingle in the Tim Burton/Joel Schumacher Batman film series, Gary Oldman in The Dark Knight Trilogy, Ben McKenzie in Gotham, J. K. Simmons in the DC Extended Universe (DCEU) film Justice League and its director's cut, and Jeffrey Wright in The Batman. In 2011, Jim Gordon was ranked 19th in IGN's "Top 100 Comic Book Heroes".

Publication history
Created by Bill Finger and Bob Kane, Gordon debuted in the first panel of Detective Comics #27 (May 1939), in which he is referred to simply as Commissioner Gordon. The character's name was taken from the earlier pulp character Commissioner James W. "Wildcat" Gordon, also known as "The Whisperer", created in 1936 by Henry Ralston, John Nanovic, and Lawrence Donovan for Street & Smith.

Fictional character biography
Of Scottish descent, Gordon had served in the United States Marine Corps prior to becoming a police officer. In most versions of the Batman mythos, Jim Gordon is at one point or another depicted as commissioner of the Gotham City Police Department. Gordon frequently contacts Batman for help in solving various crimes, particularly those committed by supervillains. Generally it is Gordon who uses the Bat-signal to summon Batman, and it has become a running joke of sorts that the Dark Knight will often disappear in the middle of the discussion when Gordon's back is turned. Gordon is usually depicted with silver or red hair, eyeglasses, and a mustache. In most incarnations, he is seen wearing a trenchcoat, necktie, and on occasion, a fedora hat. He is also sometimes pictured with a cane, although it is not revealed why he uses it. Because DC Comics retconned its characters' history in the 1985 miniseries Crisis on Infinite Earths, and because of different interpretations in television and film, the details of Gordon's history vary from story to story.

He has been married twice; first to Barbara Eileen Kean and then to Sarah Essen.

Early characterizations
In the original pre-Crisis version of his history, Gordon is a police detective who initially resents the mysterious vigilante's interference in police business. He first appears in Detective Comics #27, in the very first Batman story, in which they both investigate the murder of a chemical industrialist. Although Batman fights on the side of justice, his methods and phenomenal track record for stopping crimes and capturing criminals embarrasses the police by comparison. Eventually, Batman meets up with Gordon and persuades the detective that they need each other's help. Gordon deputizes Batman, and thereafter the Dark Knight works with Gordon as an agent of the law.

In Batman Special #1, it is revealed that Gordon, as a young cop, shot and killed two robbers in self-defense in front of their son. The results of this event would lead the boy to become the first Wrath, a cop killer with a costume and motif inspired by Batman, who would come after Gordon for revenge years later.

Post-Crisis and Zero Hour

Batman: Year One

The post-Crisis version of the character was introduced in the 1987 storyline Batman: Year One, written by Frank Miller. In this version, James W. Gordon is transferred back to Gotham City after spending more than 15 years in Chicago. A man of integrity, Gordon finds that Batman is his only ally against the corrupt administration, which is in the pocket of mob boss Carmine Falcone. One of the most significant differences in this version is that Batman is never deputized and Gordon's relationship with him is kept out of the public eye whenever possible. It is also added that he is a special forces veteran who is capable in hand-to-hand combat; he retaliates against an intimidation attempt by corrupt fellow officers with equal violence. He is depicted as having an extra-marital affair with a fellow detective, Sarah Essen. Gordon breaks off their affair after being blackmailed by the corrupt police commissioner, Gillian B. Loeb. Falcone sends his nephew, Johnny Viti, to kill Gordon's wife and son; Batman saves them, however, and helps Gordon expose Loeb's corruption. After Loeb resigns, Gordon is promoted to captain.

The 1998 miniseries Gordon of Gotham takes place nearly 20 years prior to the current events of the DC Universe and two months before his arrival in Gotham in Batman: Year One. It reveals that Gordon, during his tenure in Chicago, struggled with his wife over conceiving a child while taking night classes in criminology. He becomes a minor celebrity after a foiling a late-night robbery attempt. When he decides to investigate a corrupt fellow officer, however, the officer and his cronies assault him, and the police department discredits him in order to cover up the scandal. Gordon then uncovers evidence of rigging in the city council election and brings down two of his fellow officers, which leads to his commander transferring him to Gotham.

The story Wrath Child, published in Batman Confidential issues 13–16, retcons Gordon's origin yet again: in this continuity, Gordon started his career in Gotham, but transferred to Chicago after shooting a corrupt cop and his wife (the parents of the original Wrath). The transfer was arranged by Loeb, then a captain, in an attempt to keep himself and his fellow corrupt cops from being exposed. Loeb threatens the future Wrath's life in order to force Gordon to comply with the transfer. Gordon later transfers back to Gotham around the same time Batman starts his career.

While still a lieutenant, Gordon convinces Loeb's successor to implement the Bat-Signal as a means to contact Batman and also to frighten criminals. It is around this time that the first Robin, Dick Grayson, becomes Batman's sidekick. Gordon initially disapproves of Batman recruiting a child to fight dangerous criminals, but soon grows to not only accept the boy but trust him as much as he does Batman.

Gordon quickly rises to the rank of commissioner after he and Batman weed out corruption within the department. After the death of his brother and sister-in-law, he adopts his niece, Barbara. Soon after he adopts Barbara, he divorces his wife, who returned to Chicago with their son James Jr., while he retains custody of Barbara, who eventually becomes Batgirl. Gordon quickly deduces the heroine's true identity, and attempts to confront her about it, going so far as to search her bedroom for proof. However, he was semi-tricked out of this belief, when Batman (after sanctioning Batgirl officially) had Robin dress up as Batgirl while Barbara is on the roof with her father. Gordon would continue to believe his daughter is indeed Batgirl, but would not confront her about it again, until years later.

Batman: The Killing Joke
In the 1988 graphic novel The Killing Joke, the Joker kidnaps Gordon after shooting and paralyzing Barbara. He then cages Gordon in the freak show of an abandoned amusement park and forces him to look at enlarged photos of his wounded daughter in an effort to drive him insane, thus proving to Batman that even seemingly normal people can lose their minds after having "one bad day". Batman eventually apprehends the Joker and rescues Gordon. Despite the intense trauma he has endured, Gordon's sanity and ethical code are intact; he insists that Batman apprehend the Joker without harming him in order to "show him that our way works".

Marriage
Soon after Sarah Essen returns to Gordon's life, they rekindle their romance and get engaged. However, Essen cannot comprehend why Gordon needs Batman so much, which occasionally puts a strain on their relationship. Later, Gordon suffers a heart attack; his chain-smoking over the years has weakened his heart. This event later lead DC Comics to partner with the American Heart Association to create a public service announcement to raise awareness of the danger of tobacco smoking and how it would threaten one's health.

In Batman: Legends of the Dark Knight Annual #2, shortly before their planned wedding, former Lieutenant Arnold Flass (Gordon's former partner) beats Gordon and kidnaps James Jr. for ransom in exchange for letting a corrupt judge go free. Batman saves James Jr., while Gordon, Essen, Flass and the judge are trapped and must work together to escape.

For a brief period following the Knightfall and Prodigal storylines, Gordon is removed from his post as commissioner and replaced by his own wife, due partly to his own disinclination to trust Batman after two substitutes — Jean-Paul Valley and Dick Grayson — assume the role and do not bother to tell him about the switch.

No Man's Land
The No Man's Land storyline takes place after Gotham is destroyed by an earthquake and isolated from outside assistance. Inside Gotham, Gordon struggles to maintain order in the midst of a crime wave. Batman is mysteriously absent for the initial three months, and Gordon feels betrayed. He forges an uneasy alliance with Two-Face, but the partnership does not last; Two-Face kidnaps Gordon, putting him on trial for breaking their "legally binding" alliance. Gordon escapes, however, and later meets with Batman once again. In this confrontation, Gordon berates Batman for letting Gotham "fall into ruin". Batman offers to prove his trust by revealing his secret identity, but Gordon refuses to look when Batman removes his mask. Eventually, the two repair their friendship.

At the end of the No Man's Land storyline, the Joker kills Sarah Essen-Gordon. An enraged Gordon barely restrains himself from killing Joker, shooting the madman in the knee instead. Not long afterward, Gordon is shot by a criminal seeking revenge for a previous arrest. Though seriously injured, he survives, and eventually makes a full recovery.

Retirement
Gordon retires from the police force after having served for more than 20 years. He remains in Gotham, and occasionally enjoys nighttime visits from Batman. Despite being retired, Gordon often finds himself drawn to a series of life-and-death circumstances, such as the Joker sending him flowers during Last Laugh, or being contacted by the temporarily reformed Harvey Dent to stop Batman from killing the Joker, to being kidnapped by Francis Sullivan, grandson of one of Gotham's notorious serial killers, during the Made of Wood storyline. After the attack by Sullivan, Batman gives Gordon an encrypted cellphone, the so-called Batphone, in case he needs to contact him, which also carries a transmitter in case of trouble. He also still has contacts with the country's law enforcement agencies, through which the sheriff's departments request Gordon to contact Batman for help investigating a series of unusual murders on a suburb territory outside the city's limits; it turns out to be a paranormal case involving black magic, occult rituals, and the supernatural. Commissioner Michael Akins has taken his position, with many officers expressing reluctance to follow him out of loyalty to Gordon.

After Barbara requires surgery to counter the life-threatening effects of the Brainiac virus, Gordon visits her in Metropolis. She reveals to him her current role as Oracle, as well as her past as Batgirl. Gordon admits that he knew of her life as Batgirl, but is pleasantly surprised to know of her second career as Oracle.

Return
As part of DC's "One Year Later", Gordon has once again become Gotham's police commissioner. He rebuilds the Bat-Signal, but still carries the mobile Batphone that Batman gave him. The circumstances behind this are currently unknown, though there have been allusions to extreme corruption within the GCPD. These allusions are supported by events within Gotham Central, especially involving Detective Jim Corrigan. Gordon survives an attempt on his life by the Joker (Batman #655), who had drugged him with Joker Venom in an attack on the GCPD. He is taken to the hospital in time.

Blackest Night
During the Blackest Night crossover, while mourning the passing of the original Batman, who was apparently killed in action during Final Crisis, Gordon and his daughter witness Green Lantern crash into the Bat-Signal, after being assaulted by a reanimated version of the deceased Martian Manhunter. After offering the hero a spare car, the Gordons then find themselves fighting for their lives against the reanimated versions of the original Batman's rogues gallery at Gotham Central, where Gordon makes short work of serial killer Abattoir (in Black Lantern form) with a shotgun. They are rescued by the current Dark Knight, Robin, Red Robin, and Deadman, but are later attacked by Batman and Red Robin's parents, the reanimated Graysons and the Drakes. While Batman and Red Robin battle the Black Lanterns, Robin takes the Gordons to their underground base. It is later shown that Alfred Pennyworth tends his wounds (Gordon is unconscious, thus protecting the team's secret identities) along with Barbara's at the bunker's infirmary.

The New 52
In September 2011, The New 52 rebooted DC's continuity. In this new timeline, Jim Gordon is still the commissioner of the GCPD and a former Marine but is younger than his traditional portrayal; he still has the red hair and mustache from Batman: Year One. He is still married to his wife Barbara, and he and Barbara are the biological parents of Barbara "Babs" Gordon (a.k.a. Batgirl).

During the Forever Evil storyline, commissioner Gordon enters Blackgate Penitentiary in order to save the warden. When a turf war erupts between the Arkham inmates, Gordon helps to evacuate the citizens from Gotham City.

In Batman Eternal, the storyline begins when Gordon is tricked into shooting at an unarmed suspect in an underground train station, resulting in a train derailing and Gordon being arrested. While incarcerated, Gordon is visited by his son, who makes arrangements to leave his father's cell open and provide him with an opportunity to escape Blackgate, believing that his father's actions are the result of him at least subconsciously acknowledging the 'truth' that Gotham is beyond saving and his attempts to be a hero are pointless. However, despite his doubts, Gordon decides to remain in prison, concluding that Gotham is still worth saving and simply musing that he may just be getting old and made a mistake. Although villains such as the Penguin attempt to attack Gordon while in prison, Gordon uses Batman's example to inspire fear in his 'fellow inmates' with minimal effort until he is released as the final assault on Gotham begins, proceeding to rally all of Gotham to stand up and take back their city to aid Batman for everything he has ever done for them.

Batman
Following Bruce Wayne's apparent death in battle with the Joker during the events of Batman (vol. 2) #40, Gordon took up the mantle of Batman using a mecha style suit to fight crime in Gotham City. Gordon first appears as Batman in Divergence #1, a DC Comics 2015 Free Comic Book Day issue, in which he is shown to be sponsored by the mega-corp Powers International. He also notes that this is "the worst idea in the history of Gotham", as he suits up, but agreed to the offer when various sources argued that there was nobody else capable of understanding Gotham the way Batman had done over the years, Gordon contemplating the merits of a Batman who works with the system rather than outside it. However, he begins to recognize the problems of this approach when he discovers that some of his past arrests have been murdered while out on parole and he is forbidden from investigating the crime himself. Gordon later meets the currently-depowered Superman when Clark comes to Gotham to investigate evidence that the weapons currently being used against him were created in Gotham, but their initial meeting results in a fight as Superman doesn't believe that Gordon is the new Batman and Gordon doubts Superman due to him currently working with Luthor. Although Gordon doubts Superman's abilities as a hero due to his current powerless state, he eventually works with Superman to stop Vandal Savage stealing an artificial sun created in Gotham to use as part of his latest plan, their alliance helping Gordon recognize Superman's continued merits as a hero while Superman in turn acknowledges that the new Batman gets the job done. Gordon later works with the Justice League to investigate the death of a large monster, the heroes noting after the case has concluded that Batman's high opinion of Gordon's abilities as a detective were well-founded. Despite Gordon's best efforts, political issues in the department result in new villain Mr. Bloom destroying his armour and mounting a massive assault on Gotham after seriously injuring Gordon, prompting the amnesic Bruce Wayne — ironically inspired by a conversation with the equally — amnesiac Joker — to try and reclaim his role as Batman. The crisis concludes with Bloom defeated by the returned Batman using some of Gordon's equipment while working with his old ally. The return of the true Batman prompts the GCPD to shut down the program and restore Gordon to his role as commissioner, Gordon musing that the world needs Batman to face its nightmares so that normal human beings can learn to cope with the more regular problems.

DC Rebirth

In June 2016, the DC Rebirth event relaunched DC Comics' entire line of comic book titles, in which Jim Gordon has a continued role in Detective Comics and the third volume of Batman. In December 2017, DC Comics ended the Rebirth branding, opting to include everything under a larger DC Universe banner and naming, and Gordon continues to be featured in Detective Comics and the third volume of Batman. For a time Gordon is corrupted by the toxin used by The Batman Who Laughs, an alternate version of Batman contaminated by the chemicals that drove the Joker insane, but Batman is able to get help from Superman in capturing Gordon and the other infected heroes until a cure can be found.

In 2021, DC began publishing a new Joker series. The first story arc (at least through the first six issues) is told primarily from Gordon's perspective. He has retired from public service and agrees to look for Joker on behalf of a secretive organization. His daughter Barbara provides intelligence and communications support.

Gordon and Batman's identity
In most versions of the mythos, Gordon is ignorant of Batman's identity. There is usually the implication that Gordon is intelligent enough to solve the mystery, but chooses not to in order to preserve Batman's effectiveness and maintain his own plausible deniability. In the 1966 Batman film, Gordon explicitly states his desire not to know for just such a reason.

In the pre-Crisis era, a 1952 story (Batman #71) shows Gordon trying to uncover Batman's identity merely for his own satisfaction, but Batman discovers Gordon's scheme and skillfully outwits him. A later story in the 1960s shows Gordon giving a bedridden Bruce Wayne (who had contracted a nearly fatal fever as Batman) "Chinese oranges", a natural treatment for the fever. Later, Bruce opines to Dick Grayson if it is possible that Gordon is beginning to suspect Batman's identity.

In Batman: Year One, Gordon claims not to see the unmasked Batman well (whom his wife at that time, Barbara, also sees) because he wasn't wearing his eyeglasses. Gordon suspects that Bruce Wayne may be Batman, though he never follows up on his suspicions. In Batman: The Animated Series, Gordon has implied he deliberately avoids deep investigation on the subject of Batman or Batgirl's identity.

Likewise, in the 1980s Detective Comics storyline Blind Justice, the world at large incorrectly supposes Batman is dead and Gordon comments to Bruce Wayne that Batman has earned the right to retirement if he so desires. He then rather pointedly asks Bruce's advice on whether or not he should reveal that Batman still lives.

When Hugo Strange attempted to determine Batman's identity early in his career (in a story written in the post-Crisis era), he began his research by focusing on muggings and murders committed in the last few years based on the idea that Batman was prompted into his current role by a traumatic loss as a result of criminal activity, prompting Gordon – upon learning of Strange's research – to reflect that Strange had already made a mistake as he was underestimating the physical demands that would be required for Batman to have reached his current level of skill by looking at crimes committed such a short time ago, suggesting that Gordon had already considered such an avenue of investigation (even if he may or may not have followed it up). A chronologically later storyline involving Strange pre-Crisis involved Alfred being hospitalized as part of Strange's scheme, and during a conversation between Gordon and Batman over the phone after Strange's defeat, Gordon pointedly tells Batman to inform an unnamed 'mutual acquaintance' that Gordon has checked on the acquaintance's friend in the hospital and the doctors expect a full recovery.

During No Man's Land, Batman attempts to regain Gordon's trust by revealing his identity. Gordon refuses to look at him after he removes the cowl, however, stating that if he wanted to know Batman's identity, he could have figured it out years ago, and even cryptically saying, "And for all you know, maybe I did."

During the Hush story arc, while working with Superman, Batman discusses whether or not Perry White has figured out Superman's secret identity. Theorizing that White is too good a reporter to not have figured it out, he draws the same comparison to himself and Gordon, stating that Gordon is too good a detective to not have figured it out. In that same story arc, Gordon, in an attempt to stop Batman from killing the Joker, tells Batman to remember who his role models are (his parents) and the beliefs they instilled in him. As well, he asks Batman to remember who and what made him who he is, a rather obvious reference to the criminal who gunned down his parents in front of him, suggesting that Gordon knows that Bruce Wayne is Batman.

Barbara reveals her identities to her father in Birds of Prey #89. Gordon then reveals that he was well aware of her status as Batgirl all along, though he purposefully avoided looking into what she was doing after she was paralyzed. Batman chides her for revealing herself, saying it was a mistake, but she counters that, while he taught her to fight criminals, it was her father who taught her to be human.

In Blackest Night: Batman, Gordon is present when Deadman refers to the current Batman as "Grayson" and after the current Robin took Gordon and his daughter to the new Batman's underground base. It is implied that Gordon is unconscious when they meet Alfred Pennyworth.

At the conclusion of Batman: The Black Mirror, Gordon strongly implies to Dick Grayson that he is aware of the secret identities of Grayson and the Waynes, when he thanks Grayson for everything he had done for him over the course of the story. Grayson attempts to brush this off, thinking Gordon meant only the forensic assistance he had given, from which Gordon cuts him off, saying "I mean, thank you. On all fronts." A long moment of silence follows, and Grayson accepts his thanks.

During Gordon's brief career as Batman when Bruce was suffering total amnesia after his temporary death in his last fight with the Joker, Gordon meets with Bruce Wayne and introduces himself as Batman, noting how strange it is to be saying that to Bruce, but his response could suggest that he considers it strange based on the public perception that Bruce Wayne was Batman's financial backer rather than making it clear that he knows who Bruce was. After Bruce is forced to sacrifice his new persona to download his old memories as Batman into his mind to save Gotham from new villain Mr. Bloom, Gordon apologizes for making Batman come back, noting that his friend was at peace while he was away, and starts to call him 'B...' before stopping himself, but Batman ignores the near-name in favor of assuring Gordon that the man he might have been without Batman died long ago.

Knowledge in other continuities
In Frank Miller's The Dark Knight Returns, Gordon and Bruce Wayne are portrayed as close friends in their civilian identities, with Gordon having discovered Batman's identity years before around the time of Bruce's retirement in his mid-forties (Bruce is explicitly identified as being 55 at the time of the story).

In the Batman: Year 100 storyline, which takes place in 2039, Captain Jim Gordon, grandson of commissioner Gordon, finds an old laptop in the attic of a country home owned by Gordon and discovers a secret file which he assumes contains long-lost information on Batman. After unsuccessfully trying numerous passwords with relevance to the Batman universe he inputs "Bruce Wayne" and is granted access to the file contents.

In the Flashpoint universe, Gordon knows about Thomas Wayne's identity as Batman and works with him in both his identities.

In the Batman - Vampire trilogy in the Elseworlds series, Gordon is shown to be aware of Batman's connection to Alfred Pennyworth by the second graphic novel in the trilogy, working with Alfred as Batman succumbs to his new, darker nature, but his knowledge of Batman's identity as Bruce Wayne is virtually irrelevant as Batman had abandoned his life as Bruce Wayne after he was transformed into a full vampire while fighting Dracula.

As in most continuities, Gordon decides in the Christopher Nolan trilogy that he prefers to remain ignorant of Batman's identity and agrees that his anonymity – even in death – has sociological value. Immediately prior to Batman's apparent self-sacrifice near the end of The Dark Knight Rises, Gordon learns the truth when Batman makes a reference to Gordon's kindness to him as a child. Following Batman's apparent death in a nuclear detonation, Gordon attends Wayne's empty-casket burial with Blake and Wayne's/Batman's confidants, Alfred Pennyworth and Lucius Fox.

In Sean Murphy's Batman: White Knight, the Joker – now known as Jack Napier – is cured of his mental illness and legally prosecutes Gordon and the GCPD, holding them accountable for cooperating with Batman for decades. As a member of the city council, Napier suggests redirecting funds dedicated to repairing damages to the city caused by Batman to the GCPD and argues that Batman should have shared his technology with the GCPD long ago. Napier's arguments cause a rift between Gordon and Batman, ending with Batman unmasking himself to Gordon in order to regain his trust. Initially, Gordon discourages Batman from revealing his secret identity to the public, but in the sequel, Batman: Curse of the White Knight, Gordon changes his mind when the Joker publicly reveals Batgirl's secret identity, believing that this would not have happened if Batman had publicly unmasked. Even though Gordon expresses regret over blaming Batman for the Joker's actions, they never get a chance to reconcile as Gordon is murdered shortly thereafter by Azrael.

Family

Pre-Crisis

Anthony "Tony" Gordon
In Pre-Crisis continuity, Jim Gordon is the biological father of Anthony "Tony" Gordon. Originally referred to as a college student, Tony later disappears while hiding from Communist spies. He is later reunited with his sister, Barbara, and dies in a battle with the Sino-Supermen (Batman Family #12, Detective Comics #482). In Post-Crisis continuity, there has been no mention of Tony Gordon.

Barbara "Barb" Gordon

Barbara "Barb" Gordon is the biological daughter of James "Jim" Gordon in Pre-Crisis continuity. She also leads a double life as a librarian and as costumed crimefighter Batgirl. Barbara is also the link of the DC Universe Oracle. Her father is aware of her crime-fighting career and is proud of her for it.

Post-Crisis

Barbara Eileen Kean
Barbara Eileen Kean is Gordon's ex-wife and mother of Barbara Gordon in Post-Crisis continuity. Her history and existence has been repeatedly retconned over the years, sometimes implying that she died in a car crash, other times that she left Gotham with James for Chicago. During the New 52 era, Barbara left her family because she was afraid that James Jr. would hurt his sister. Several years later, she returns to Gotham in the hopes of re-connecting with her daughter.

In Batman: Year One, Detective Gordon has a brief affair with Detective Sarah Essen. Gordon tries to rebuild his relationship with his family after Essen leaves Gotham. 
Gordon and his wife attend marriage counseling.

 Melinda McGraw portrayed Barbara Kean in The Dark Knight.
 Grey DeLisle voiced her in Batman: Year One. 
 Erin Richards portrays Barbara Kean in Gotham. Introduced as Jim Gordon's fiancée, she turns to crime after murdering her wealthy parents, and eventually becomes one of the most powerful gangsters in the city. In the show's final season, she becomes pregnant after a one-night stand with Gordon, who has by now left her for Lee Thompkins, and gives birth to their daughter, Barbara Lee. The show's series finale portrays her years later having given up crime and become a legitimate businesswoman, and sharing custody of Barbara Lee with Gordon and Thompkins. The series also portrays her as being bisexual, and having on-off relationships with Renee Montoya and Tabitha Galavan.
 Sara J. Southey portrays Barbara Kean in Batwoman. In the episode "We're All Mad Here", Barbara is an art gallery owner and member of Black Glove. After witnessing James Jr. tie a labradoodle to the train tracks, Barbara used different medicines on him which left him in a vegetative state at Arkham Asylum. Marquis Jet later kidnapped her, Jada Jet, and the other Black Glove members where Marquis subjected Barbara to the same medicines through a special gas mask. Batwoman was able to save her and Jada while arranging for Barbara to get medical help.
 Kari Wuhrer voiced her in Batman: Gotham by Gaslight.
 Lake Bell voiced her in Harley Quinn.
 Amy Landecker voiced her in Batman: The Long Halloween.

James Gordon Jr.

Gordon and his wife, Barbara Kean are the parents of a son named James Gordon Jr. (Batman #404-407). James Jr. and his mother moved to Chicago after she divorced the elder Gordon. After his introduction in Batman: Year One, the character appeared almost exclusively in comics set during the Year One era, and went virtually unmentioned in present day. Scott Snyder's story Batman: The Black Mirror reintroduced James Jr. as an adult, and establishes that he is a sociopath who tortures and kills for pleasure. He is institutionalized as a teenager after he disfigures a school bus driver who insulted him. After he is released years later, he commits a series of brutal murders, while trying to frame the Joker for his crimes. After nearly killing his mother, and capturing his step-sister, James Jr. is apprehended by his father and Batman (Dick Grayson), and institutionalized in Arkham.

In The New 52, James Jr. appears in the Batgirl series. He escapes from Arkham, and begins stalking his sister, whom he views as a rival for his father's affection. The series reveals that he deliberately caused the divorce of his parents: he killed a cat his mother had bought for Barbara and then threatened to kill his sister if she did not leave the family and threatened to kill Barbara if she tried to contact them ever again.

A different version of James Gordon Jr. appears briefly in the films Batman Begins and The Dark Knight, in which he is portrayed as the young son of James and Barbara. In the latter film, Two-Face tries to kill the boy in order to get back at Gordon, whom he blames for the death of his fiancée, Rachel Dawes. Batman saves James Jr. by tackling Two-Face off of a roof, killing him.

Jimmy Jr was mentioned in the Batwoman episode "We're All Mad Here".

Sarah Essen
Sarah Essen (Batman Annual #13, Batman: Legends of the Dark Knight Annual #2) was first referenced as Gordon's wife during the future tale The Dark Knight Returns. She first appeared fully in Batman: Year One as a co-worker with whom Gordon has an extra-marital affair. After realizing they could not be together, she transferred out of state. Years after his divorce, Sarah returns to Gotham, and the two renew their relationship. After marrying Gordon, Sarah is murdered by Joker at the end of the No Man's Land storyline. Flashpoint altered the events in the DC Universe's timeline, so during The New 52 era, Sarah's marriage to Gordon never happened. However, starting with 2016's DC Rebirth, characters have begun to remember pre-New 52 events. As such, in The Joker (vol. 2) #6, Jim Gordon refers to Barbara Kean Gordon as his first wife, which implies that he married another woman after her.

Other versions

The Dark Knight Returns
Jim Gordon appears in the limited series Batman: The Dark Knight Returns, which presents a future where a retiring Gordon not only knows Batman's identity, but is good friends with Bruce Wayne. He then makes a cameo on Batman: The Dark Knight Strikes Again. Now retired, he has written a book about Batman, who is believed to be dead.

Gordon is also referred to in the first issue of the series, All Star Batman and Robin the Boy Wonder, set in the same universe as and prior to The Dark Knight Returns. He made a full appearance on issue #6, as a police captain, having a conversation with his ex-partner, Sarah Essen, about Batman. He's still married to Barbara Kean, who is now an alcoholic, and has a troubled son, James Jr. Just as other continuities, his daughter, Barbara, who is 15, becomes Batgirl. Frank Miller has commented that the series is set in his Dark Knight Universe, which includes all of the Batman works by Frank Miller, therefore Barbara's inclusion confirms that Gordon had two children during Batman: Year One, at least in Miller's version of the continuity. At the end of the series, it's implied that, despite being married to Barbara Kean, he's still in love with Sarah.

JLA: Earth 2
On the Anti-Matter Earth, where the evil Crime Syndicate of America live, Commissioner Gordon's counterpart is a crime boss named Boss Gordon, an ally to Owlman. Boss Gordon is the city's leading crime boss until his empire is toppled by Batman and commissioner Thomas Wayne.

JLA: The Nail
In a world where Superman was never found by the Kents, reference is made to Gordon having been murdered shortly before the events of the story, resulting in Gotham's police department being granted extra powers of authority in his absence, although these are never fully explained.

Batman: Gotham Noir
In the Elseworlds title Batman: Gotham Noir, Jim Gordon is an alcoholic hard-boiled private detective who had left the police force following a failure to solve the disappearance of a judge. He is Selina Kyle's former lover and Bruce Wayne's wartime partner.

Batman: In Darkest Knight
In the Elseworlds story Batman: In Darkest Knight, Jim Gordon is an honest cop who distrusts Green Lantern (who in this reality is Bruce Wayne) because of his near-limitless power. Lantern comes to Gordon in order to find the identity of the man who killed his parents, but Gordon rebukes him. Later on, he changes his mind and starts investigating, but he is then interrupted and killed by Sinestro, who ruptures his heart.

Vampire Batman
In the Vampire Batman Elseworlds trilogy that began with Batman & Dracula: Red Rain, Gordon learns that a coven of vampires, led by Count Dracula himself, is behind a series of murders. Dracula captures him, but he defies the vampire even as he is bled from a cut on his neck, with Batman arriving in time to save Gordon from bleeding to death before confronting Dracula, the Dark Knight now a vampire himself thanks to the aid of renegade vampires opposing Dracula. In the sequel Batman: Bloodstorm, as Batman acts alone while struggling to resist his thirst for blood, Gordon and Alfred collaborate to form a team to eliminate a new family of vampires in daylight while they sleep, but even after the other vampires have been destroyed, Gordon and Alfred are forced to stake Batman after he succumbs to his thirst and drains the Joker's blood. The third part of the trilogy— Batman: Crimson Mist— sees Gordon and Alfred forced to work with Two-Face and Killer Croc to stop the vampire Batman, returned from the staking and having already targeted and killed Penguin, Riddler, Scarecrow and Poison Ivy, Gordon grimly stating that, even if he is only killing criminals, the man they knew would never have killed. The story concludes with Gordon being crushed by debris from the Batcave roof after explosives are planted to destroy it, thus exposing Batman to the sunlight and ending his reign of terror.

Earth-8
In Lord Havok and the Lord Havok and the Extremists #3, an alternate version of Gordon, known as Zombie Gordon is featured as part of Monarch's army. A flesh-hungry beast, Zombie Gordon is kept in line by Bat-Soldier, via a large chain.

Flashpoint
In the alternate timeline of the Flashpoint event, James Gordon is the chief of police, instead of being commissioner, and also works with Thomas Wayne, the Flashpoint version of Batman. Later, Gordon tries to convince Batman that he does not have to fight villains by himself, but Batman refuses. When Gordon locates Martha Wayne (this continuity's version of the Joker) in old Wayne Manor, he goes in without backup. Gordon is then tricked into shooting Harvey Dent's daughter, having been disguised as Joker, as she had been taped to a chair and had her mouth taped shut with a smile painted on the tape. Martha then appears and slashes Gordon's throat, and Gordon dies by Joker venom.

Earth One
In the graphic novel by Geoff Johns and Gary Frank, Batman: Earth One, Jim Gordon is featured as a central character. In the story, he's a broken man who has given up on fighting corruption until the emergence of Batman. He is also partnered with a young Harvey Bullock. On the trail of the "Birthday Boy" killings, Gordon and Batman put aside their differences and stop the killer while saving Gordon's daughter Barbara. In the sequel, Gordon begin his alliance with Batman to combat the Riddler, who plots to takeover the remnant of Oswald Cobblepott's criminal empire. He is also being promoted as police captain after he arrested his corrupted predecessor.

Injustice: Gods Among Us
In the prequel to the video game Injustice: Gods Among Us, Gordon learns via Superman's x-ray vision that he has terminal lung cancer. Later on he, Bullock and Montoya join forces with Batman's Insurgency to fight the Regime, and together they attack the Hall of Justice. Batman's inside man Lex Luthor notes that Gordon's cancer is worsening due his taking "super pills" that give people superhuman abilities. Gordon takes two of the super pills to save Barbara from Cyborg on the Watchtower, as he is scanning to find her location, accelerating the cancer to the point that he has only minutes to live. After the battle, Gordon thanks Batman and says goodbye to Barbara as he dies, looking down on the Earth.

Batman: Damned
In the Batman: Damned miniseries, printed under the DC Black Label, Gordon is seen questioning a homeless man who had apparently witnessed the showdown between Batman and the Joker that led to Joker's death. Gordon is next seen at the police standoff with Harley Quinn and the rest of the Joker's henchmen, attempting in vain to get them to stand down.

Dark Multiverse
Various versions of Gordon appear in the Dark Multiverse depicted in Dark Nights: Metal:

 In the world of the Dawnbreaker, where Bruce Wayne received a Green Lantern ring after the deaths of his parents, Gordon attempts to confront the Dawnbreaker about his use of lethal force on criminals, but the Dawnbreaker kills him. 
 In the world of the Batman Who Laughs, Gordon's death contributed to Batman's final confrontation with the Joker, which led to Batman being contaminated by his foe's blood and transformed into The Batman Who Laughs. 
 In the world of the Grim Knight, where Batman's use of guns and lethal force led to him turning Gotham into a police state, Gordon was eventually able to determine Batman's secret identity with the aid of information from Alfred, who became unable to countenance Batman's use of lethal force on all criminals, allowing him to arrest Bruce Wayne.

Earth 3
When the "Infinite Frontier" event happened, Earth 3 was rebooted. Like the version seen in JLA: Earth 2, Jim Gordon operated as a crime boss. After his son Jimmy Jr. was killed by criminals Thomas Wayne and Martha Wayne, Boss Gordon sent his minion Harvey Bullock to kill them which also led to Harvey also killing Bruce and leaving Thomas Wayne Jr. alive. Thomas Wayne Jr. in the identity of Owlman would later learn of this motive when he captures Harvey Bullock years later.

Earth-89 (Batman '89) 
In the universe where the films Batman (1989) and Batman Returns is set, it is retroactively established in the comic book miniseries Batman '89 that Pat Hingle's iteration of Gordon was the patrolman who found and comforted Bruce in the alley where his parents were murdered. He is later killed by Billy Dee Williams's Harvey Dent after the character becomes Two-Face.

In other media

Television

Live-action

 In the 1960s Batman series, Commissioner Gordon was played by Neil Hamilton, and is portrayed as not only having the Bat-Signal at his disposal, but also a red emergency hotline telephone (known as the Bat-Phone) that connects directly to the Batcave, the Batmobile and (unbeknownst to Gordon) Bruce Wayne's study. Gordon's switchboard operators are twice shown to be able to trunk incoming lines into the Batphone circuit, enabling him to telephone Batman from remote locations (ironically once from Wayne Manor, and the other from a phone booth adjacent to that being used by Bruce Wayne). Batman (Adam West) and Robin (Burt Ward) are regular visitors to his office. The series occasionally made light of his dependence on Batman. In "The Devil's Fingers", when Batman is apparently unavailable, Gordon and Police Chief O'Hara (Stafford Repp) lament that they will have to solve a case by themselves; this contrasted the cold open of the pilot episode "Hi Diddle Riddle", in which Gordon reluctantly decides to summon Batman only after O'Hara and all of his bureau chiefs gather and unanimously agree that the Riddler (Frank Gorshin) is beyond their abilities. This version of Gordon has at least two grown children, the elder of whom is unspecified but has given him at least two grandchildren, and the younger being Barbara (Yvonne Craig), who, unbeknownst to her father, is Batgirl. His wife is occasionally mentioned but never named.
 Commissioner James "Jimmy" Gordon is mentioned in The Flash episode "Flash of Two Worlds".

 In the 2014 Fox drama Gotham, James "Jim" Gordon is played by Ben McKenzie and is portrayed as an idealistic rookie detective in the corrupt Gotham City Police Department and a war veteran of the United States Army. His late father was Gotham's district attorney, whom crime boss Carmine Falcone (John Doman) claims was on his payroll. Gordon is the first police officer to interview Bruce Wayne (David Mazouz) after his parents are murdered in the pilot episode, and vows to solve the murders. He is quickly drawn into the city's underbelly, thanks to his shady partner Harvey Bullock (Donal Logue) and small-time criminal Oswald Cobblepot (Robin Lord Taylor). He also makes two new acquaintances: a teenage street thief named Selina Kyle (Camren Bicondova) who witnessed the Waynes' murder, and Gotham's young assistant district attorney, Harvey Dent (Nicholas D'Agosto), who pledges to help Gordon find the killer. The series also portrays his turbulent romances with socialite Barbara Kean (Erin Richards) and Arkham physician Leslie Thompkins (Morena Baccarin), his efforts to rid the GCPD of corruption, and his quest to stop corrupt billionaire Theo Galavan (James Frain) and the Sacred Order of Saint Dumas from taking over the city. This version of the character is forced to kill in self-defense a gangster while "collecting a debt" for Cobblepot and commits what could arguably be considered murder. He shoots the unarmed Galavan (who is later resurrected) in the head. In the series finale, "The Beginning...", Gordon has been Gotham's Police Commissioner for 10 years, and is the first to see the vigilante Batman.
 Commissioner Gordon is mentioned in the Titans episode "Dick Grayson", in which Gordon is killed by Joker in a potential future. In the episode "Barbara Gordon", the characters mention that Mr. Freeze trapped Commissioner Gordon in a block of ice with his freeze gun. Gordon died of a heart attack after being thawed, and his daughter Barbara Gordon became the new police commissioner. A photograph of Gordon appears in this episode.
 Gordon was mentioned in the Batwoman episode "We're All Mad Here".

Animation
 Ted Knight provided the voice of James Gordon in The Batman/Superman Hour.
 Jim Gordon makes two appearances in Super Friends:
 He first appeared in Challenge of the Super Friends, voiced by Danny Dark. In the episode "Super Friends, Rest In Peace", the Riddler and Cheetah hold Gordon hostage so they can kill Batman with the Noxium Crystal.
 The second is in The Super Powers Team: Galactic Guardians. In the episode "The Fear", Gordon and Jonathan Crane try to find and arrest the Scarecrow. Gordon and Batman are both unaware that Crane is Scarecrow.
 He also appeared in some of the comics related to the show.
 In Filmation's 1977 The New Adventures of Batman, Commissioner Gordon is voiced by Lennie Weinrib.

 The character has been featured in the DC Animated Universe, voiced by veteran voice actor Bob Hastings: 
 Commissioner Gordon initially appeared in the 1990s Batman: The Animated Series. His relationship with Batman was similar to that in the comics. Many scenes in the series portray Batman and the commissioner having clandestine meetings at the Bat-Signal. A flashback in the episode "Robin's Reckoning" depicts the young version as having red hair. In the episode "I Am the Night", it is revealed that Batman sees Gordon as a surrogate father - the same age had his own father still been alive - and is deeply upset when Gordon is seriously wounded by the criminal Jimmy "The Jazzman" Peek. Commissioner Gordon also appeared in Batman: Mask of the Phantasm and Batman & Mr. Freeze: SubZero. In the latter movie, he is shown to be aware of Dick Grayson's relationship with his daughter and after Grayson gets injured trying to rescue her, states that he approves of it.
 Commissioner Gordon has appeared in The New Batman Adventures. Like the rest of the cast, Gordon was redesigned for the new series. Although his design remains relatively similar to before, his build became more slender than previously, and his hair was then cropped into a flat-top design. In the episode "Holiday Knights", it is shown that Batman and Gordon meet every year on New Year's Eve in a diner to celebrate 'survival' as Gordon puts it. In the episode "Over the Edge", Barbara Gordon suffers from the Scarecrow's fear toxins, producing a nightmare where Batgirl is killed while fighting escaped Arkham inmates, without telling her father her secret. Gordon blames Batman for Barbara's death, and launches a manhunt against his former ally after discovering his secret identity on Barbara's computer. After the nightmare, Barbara tries to admit her secret identity to her father, but he says that he trusts her with whatever choices she makes, and that she doesn't need to tell him anything. The episode implies that Gordon already knows that his daughter is Batgirl, but keeps it to himself. 
 Commissioner Gordon also appeared in Superman: The Animated Series. In "World's Finest, Part One" he investigates a robbery where a dragon statue made of Kryptonite is stolen. In "Knight Time", Gordon waits for Batman with Detective Renee Montoya. What Gordon doesn't know is that he is speaking with Superman in disguise. Commissioner Gordon appeared in Batman: Mystery of the Batwoman as well.
 Commissioner Gordon appeared in Static Shock. In the episode "Hard as Nails", Batman and Static visit him when Poison Ivy and Harley Quinn hijack a cargo ship carrying gold bricks.
 The spin-off Batman Beyond portrays Barbara Gordon, who by then retired from vigilantism as having followed in her father's footsteps as Gotham's new police commissioner; a picture of Jim Gordon appears on Barbara's desk in the third episode "Black Out". In Batman Beyond: Return of the Joker, Barbara Gordon reveals to Terry McGinnis that her father is one of the few people besides Dr. Leslie Thompkins and possibly Alfred Pennyworth and Dick Grayson who knew about Tim Drake's traumatic encounter with the Joker, implying that he also learned and kept secret Batman's and possibly Robin's true identities up until he died.
 Jim Gordon appeared in The Batman, voiced by Mitch Pileggi. This version is depicted as a newly appointed Gotham City police commissioner after an incident involving the Joker, Penguin, and Riddler. He ends the manhunt against Batman and goes public with his support for the crime fighter in order to help make Gotham safer for his daughter Barbara Gordon.
 Commissioner Gordon is alluded in Batman: The Brave and the Bold. In the episode "Deep Cover for Batman!", Batman calls the commissioner to tell him that he has thwarted the Riddler's crossword puzzle crime spree. In the episode "The Color of Revenge", a flashback reveals that Batman got a call from Gordon that Crazy Quilt had broken into the museum to steal the Stimulated Emission Light Amplifier. At the episode's end, Batman gets a message from Gordon stating that Killer Moth has hijacked the Gotham Bank Money Train. In the episode "The Knights of Tomorrow", Gordon makes an appearance at Bruce Wayne and Selina Kyle's wedding as part of a story that Alfred Pennyworth is writing. He also appears with no lines in the episode "Joker: The Vile and The Villainous".
 His Zur-En-Arrh counterpart Chancellor Gor-Zonn (voiced by Corey Burton) appears in the episode "The Super Batman of Planet X", informing the Batman of Zur-En-Arrh of Rothul's attacks. 
 Commissioner Gordon appears in the Young Justice episode "Misplaced", voiced by Corey Burton.
 Commissioner Gordon appears in the Super Best Friends Forever series of shorts.
 Commissioner Gordon makes cameo appearances in Teen Titans Go!. Most of his appearances have him in the company of Batman. In the episode "La Larva de Amor", while Silkie is floating down a river in a bucket, Silkie floats past Batman and Gordon who are fishing on a dock. In "Girls Night Out", Gordon is seen in his police car laughing with Batman when they see Starfire, Raven and Jinx speed by with the police in pursuit. In the episode "Sidekick", Gordon is shown enjoying the ultimate batarang with Batman, both of them laughing. In the episode "Slumber Party", the Titans sneak onto Wayne Manor and tee-pee his fountain statue to resemble Batgirl. Batman and Gordon then go outside and find the statue, causing both of them to laugh, implying that he knows Batman's secret identity. He next appears in "The Cruel Giggling Ghost" where he, along with Batman, dress up as the two-headed ghoul to scare people away from the amusement park so they wouldn't have to wait in line for the bumper cars.
 A younger version of Jim Gordon appears in Beware the Batman, voiced by Kurtwood Smith. He starts out as a lieutenant who distrusts Batman, clashing with Barbara's support for him. Gordon reluctantly teams up with Batman to save Barbara from Tobias Whale and Phosphorus Rex, and gradually begins to trust Batman and work alongside him, even installing the Bat-Signal. In "Nexus", Gordon is promoted to police commissioner after Commissioner Correa is killed by ninjas working for the League of Assassins.
 Commissioner Gordon makes a non-speaking cameo appearance in Justice League Action episode "Galaxy Jest".
 Commissioner Gordon appears in the 2019 animated series DC Super Hero Girls, voiced by Fred Tatasciore. This version of the character has retired as Gotham City's police commissioner and moved to Metropolis with his teenage daughter Barbara.
 Commissioner Gordon appears in Harley Quinn, voiced by Christopher Meloni. Unlike most versions, this Gordon has succumbed to the toils and stress of policing Gotham and its supervillains. As such, he has become exhausted, constantly nervous, alcoholic, and at times borderline psychotic; often ranting and raving before being reined in by Batman. It has also been suggested that his job has been damaging his marriage, as he reveals that his wife was cheating on him before quickly admitting he understood why. In a flashback sequence during " All the Best Inmates Have Daddy Issues", Gordon was depicted as having an athletic slim physique before becoming overweight in the present. During season two, Gordon loses control of GCPD's remnants and his wife amidst the chaos of Joker destroying Gotham and seemingly killing Batman. While crashing with his daughter Barbara, he unknowingly inspires her to become Batgirl, and is later asked by a recuperating Batman to work with her to keep Gotham safe. After losing more of his self-confidence, Barbara reveals her identity to her father, inspiring him to overcome his alcoholism and retake the GCPD headquarters from Two-Face. Once he becomes commissioner again, Gordon is immediately tasked by the President of the United States to kill Harley Quinn so Gotham can rejoin the U.S. Though Harley brings an army of Parademons to combat his rallied Gotham citizens, she ultimately forfeits the battle. Later, while helping Batman round up the Parademons, Gordon is forced to team up with Harley to defeat a vengeful Doctor Psycho after he uses his psychic powers to enslave the Parademons and most of Harley's crew and conquer Gotham . In the season two finale, "The Runaway Bridesmaid", Gordon is left frustrated when Gotham's mayor fails to recognize his efforts in saving the city. After listening to his rants, Two-Face manipulates him into running for mayor and earning recognition by arresting all of the attending supervillains at Poison Ivy and Kite Man's wedding. However, his plan is foiled by Harley, who manages to escape from him with Ivy. In the third season, Gordon continues his mission to apprehend Harley and Ivy and run for mayor while being manipulated by Two-Face, who is only helping him so that he would regain his previous position as district attorney. In the episode "Joker: The Killing Vote", Gordon finds himself running against the Joker, who wants to become mayor to genuinely improve Gotham. After Two-Face kidnaps the Joker's stepson Benicio in an attempt to force him to abandon the election, Gordon finally realizes Two-Face's negative influence and helps the Joker defeat him and rescue Benicio. He then steps back from the election out of respect for the Joker, only to discover the latter plans to reform the GCPD, leaving Gordon jobless.

Film

Live-action

 In the 1949 15-episode movie serial Batman and Robin, commissioner Gordon was portrayed by Ed Wood regular Lyle Talbot. This was the first official film appearance of Gordon, however the 1943 Batman serial had featured a character called Captain Arnold (Charles C. Wilson), who was essentially Gordon in all but name. 
 Commissioner Gordon was played by Neil Hamilton in Batman: The Movie, based on the 1960s TV series. He advised Batman and Robin which supervillains were at large.

Burton/Schumacher series
In the Tim Burton/Joel Schumacher film adaptations of Batman, Commissioner Gordon is portrayed by Pat Hingle.

 In the script written by Tom Mankiewicz for the unmade The Batman film, which was later made as the 1989 film Batman, Gordon was set to appear as Commissioner and named David, instead of James Worthington. William Holden was considered for the role.
In Batman (1989), Gordon regards Batman (Michael Keaton) as a rumor at best and vigilante at worst, though by the end of the film, Gordon publicly acknowledges the hero's usefulness and helps present the Bat-Signal. Gordon's wife briefly appears in Batman, but is not seen or mentioned in the sequels.
In Batman Returns (1992), when the Penguin (Danny DeVito) has Batman framed for murder, it is implied Gordon is not entirely convinced, as he is not willing to use lethal force in order to apprehend him, and publicly refers to Batman's batarang at the crime scene as "purely circumstantial".
In Batman Forever (1995), Gordon is shown to be fairly well acquainted with Bruce Wayne (Val Kilmer), but unaware that he is Batman. He arrives at the scene of Wayne Enterprises employee Fred Stickley's (Ed Begley, Jr.) apparent suicide, unaware that he was actually murdered by Edward Nygma (Jim Carrey). Gordon is also present at the circus when Two-Face (Tommy Lee Jones) murders Dick Grayson's (Chris O'Donnell) family, and he later brings Dick to Wayne Manor after Bruce volunteers to take care of the young man.
 Although Barbara Gordon is his daughter in most continuities, in Batman & Robin (1997), Batgirl is characterized as Alfred Pennyworth's (Michael Gough) niece, Barbara Wilson (Alicia Silverstone). In Commissioner Gordon's last appearance in the film, Poison Ivy (Uma Thurman) uses her pheromones to make him fall in love with her in order to get the keys to police headquarters and the Bat-Signal, and almost kills him with her toxic kiss before changing her mind because of him, "being too old for her".

Gordon was planned for the aborted reboot Batman: Year One written by Darren Aronofsky and Frank Miller. In this script Gordon has lived in Gotham for years, and is trying to leave for the sake of his pregnant wife; also Gordon's wife is renamed Ann, instead of Barbara, and Gordon's character would have been suicidal.

The Dark Knight Trilogy 
In the rebooted Dark Knight Trilogy by Christopher Nolan, Gordon is played by Gary Oldman.
 Batman Begins (2005) chronicles Gordon's rise through the ranks of the Gotham City Police Department. In the beginning of the film, Gordon is a uniformed patrol officer who does his best to comfort the eight-year-old Bruce Wayne after the murder of his parents. Years later, Gordon has attained the rank of Sergeant and a now-adult Bruce (Christian Bale) regards as one of the few honest cops in Gotham City. Once Bruce adopts the Batman identity, Gordon is the first law enforcement officer he contacts; the two form a secret alliance against Carmine Falcone's (Tom Wilkinson) criminal empire. Gordon proves important when Batman fights Ra's al Ghul (Liam Neeson). Batman gives Gordon the task of destroying a monorail track using the Tumbler, halting Ra's' plan to destroy the city. At the end of the film, he is promoted to Lieutenant and shows a new Bat-Signal to Batman, also telling him of an armed robber who leaves a calling card in the form of a Joker playing card at his crime scenes. Many critics, and writer David S. Goyer, have noted that Gary Oldman's portrayal bears a strong resemblance to the way the character was drawn by David Mazzucchelli in Batman: Year One.
 In The Dark Knight (2008), Gordon is leading the GCPD Major Crimes Unit and forms a tenuous alliance with Batman and the newly elected district attorney Harvey Dent (Aaron Eckhart) to take down Gotham's organized crime syndicates. When the Joker (Heath Ledger) reveals that Commissioner Gillian B. Loeb (Colin McFarlane) is one of his upcoming targets, Gordon arrives at his office with other officers to offer protection, but he is unable to stop Loeb from drinking a glass of poisoned Scotch. At Loeb's funeral, Gordon foils the Joker's attempt on Mayor Anthony Garcia's (Nestor Carbonell) life, in the process faking his own death to protect his family. After Dent claims to be Batman, Gordon disguises himself as a SWAT officer and commandeers the armored truck that is carrying him to the county lockup for processing. Following a vehicular battle with the Joker, Gordon rescues both Batman and Dent, captures the Joker, and is promoted to Police Commissioner by the Mayor. Hours later, two corrupt cops and the Joker's men abduct Dent and Rachel Dawes (Maggie Gyllenhaal), placing them in separate buildings with oil drums rigged to explode. Batman chooses to save Rachel, while Gordon and several officers go to save Dent, unaware that the Joker has switched their locations as part of a plan to orchestrate Dent's downfall. While Batman is able to rescue Dent, Gordon arrives at Rachel's location just as the bomb explodes and kills her. Disfigured in the explosion and driven insane by grief, Dent seeks vengeance against Gordon for Rachel's death. Dent kidnaps Gordon's wife and two children, and forces Gordon to plead for their lives at the site of Rachel's death. He flips his trademark coin to decide whether Gordon's son (Nathan Gamble) should die, but Batman tackles Dent off the building, killing him. In order to preserve Dent's image as the city's 'White Knight', Batman decides to take the blame for all of Dent's murders. Gordon reluctantly agrees, having come to highly respect the Caped Crusader. After eulogizing Dent as a hero to the city, Gordon destroys the Bat-Signal and calls for a manhunt against Batman. As Batman flees, Gordon assures his son that Batman is not just a hero: he is the city's protector, a "Dark Knight".
 In The Dark Knight Rises (2012), Gordon feels remorse for concealing Dent's crimes, and contemplates resigning and revealing the truth to the city. By now, Gordon's wife has left him and taken their children. Bane's (Tom Hardy) men shoot Gordon, putting him in critical condition. A disguised Bruce Wayne visits him in the hospital, and Gordon implores his former ally to return to crimefighting. He also befriends John Blake (Joseph Gordon-Levitt) and promotes the rookie police officer to detective, seeing in the young man the dedication and idealism he once had. After Bane defeats Batman and traps most of the Gotham City Police Department underground, Gordon gets himself out of bed and defeats the League of Shadows operatives who tried to kill him in his hospital room. Bane publicly exposes Dent's crimes and Gordon's complicity in the coverup, and takes Gordon and his men prisoner. Gordon later finds a truck carrying a nuclear bomb meant to annihilate the city and places a device on it to block the trigger signal. In the final battle against Bane, Talia al Ghul (Marion Cotillard), and the League of Shadows, Batman cryptically reveals his true identity to Gordon before apparently sacrificing himself to thwart the League of Shadows' plan to destroy the city. Despite the revelation of Gordon's cover up of Dent's crimes, he remains being  police commissioner. After giving the eulogy at Bruce Wayne's funeral, Gordon discovers the Bat-Signal has been repaired and realizes that Bruce is still alive.

DC Extended Universe
 J. K. Simmons portrays Commissioner James Gordon in Justice League, which is part of the larger DC Extended Universe. Bryan Cranston (who had previously voiced Gordon in the animated adaptation of Batman: Year One) revealed to Geeking Out that he was up for the part but turned it down. Simmons also appeared as Gordon in the 2021 director's cut Zack Snyder's Justice League, and was to reprise his role in the HBO Max film Batgirl, until its cancellation in August 2022 after scoring poorly with test audiences.

The Batman
 Jeffrey Wright portrayed Gordon in the 2022 film The Batman, directed by Matt Reeves and is the first African American actor to portray the character in live action.

Animated
 In Justice League: The New Frontier, the character makes a cameo appearance in the interrogation scene with King Faraday and Martian Manhunter.
 Commissioner Gordon appeared in Batman: Gotham Knight, voiced by Jim Meskimen.
 Commissioner Gordon makes a cameo appearance in Batman: Under the Red Hood (voiced by Gary Cole albeit uncredited) during the showdown between the Joker and the Red Hood.
 Emmy award-winner Bryan Cranston voiced Lt. James Gordon in the animated film adaptation of Batman: Year One.
 Commissioner Gordon appears in the two-part Batman: The Dark Knight Returns, voiced by David Selby.
 Commissioner Gordon appears in Lego Batman: The Movie - DC Super Heroes Unite, an adaptation of the video game of the same name, voiced by Townsend Coleman.
 Commissioner Gordon appears in Son of Batman, voiced by Bruce Thomas, he reprises is role in subsequent sequels Batman: Bad Blood, and Batman: Hush.
 Commissioner Gordon appears in Batman: Assault on Arkham, voiced by Chris Cox.
 Commissioner Gordon appears in Batman Unlimited: Animal Instincts, voiced by Richard Epcar.
 Commissioner Gordon appears in Batman Unlimited: Monster Mayhem, voiced again by Richard Epcar.
 Commissioner Gordon appears in Batman: The Killing Joke, voiced by Ray Wise. In the film, Gordon is kidnapped by the Joker, who attempts to drive him mad by crippling Barbara and subjecting him to photo evidence of his crime, along with other psychological tortures. However, in the end, Gordon maintains his sanity, telling Batman to bring in Joker by the book.
 Commissioner Gordon appears in Batman: Return of the Caped Crusaders, voiced by Jim Ward. Ward reprises the role in Batman vs. Two-Face sequel.
 Commissioner Gordon appears in The Lego Batman Movie, voiced by Héctor Elizondo.
 Commissioner Gordon appears in the DC Super Hero Girls films, voiced by Tom Kenny.
 Commissioner Gordon appears in Batman: Gotham by Gaslight, voiced by Scott Patterson. Whilst an adaptation of the graphic novel of the same name, in this storyline Gordon is revealed to be the alter ego of the infamous serial killer Jack The Ripper as the main antagonist of the film, where he was still a hero in the source material, serving as a composite character with James Gordon Jr. When Batman discovers Gordon's true identity, he also learns that Gordon has been abusing his wife Barbara, torturing her with acid to try and 'burn out' her sins.
 Jim Gordon makes a brief cameo in Teen Titans Go! To the Movies.
 Commissioner Gordon appears in Batman vs. Teenage Mutant Ninja Turtles, with Jim Meskimen reprising his role.
 Commissioner Gordon appears in Batman: Death in the Family, with Gary Cole reprising his role.
 Commissioner Gordon appears in the animated film Batman: The Long Halloween, voiced by Billy Burke.

Video games
 Commissioner Gordon appears on Batman: Vengeance voiced by Bob Hastings. He awaits for Batman along his GCPD squad outside the old gasworks building, in which the Dark Knight was investigating, before being mysteriously beaten by a Batarang. This led the whole GCPD to come after Batman to arresting him. At the end of the game it was found out that was Harley Quinn to hit Jim with the Batarang, so he called Bruce to apologize.
 He also appears on the sequel Batman: Rise of Sin Tzu, with Bob Hastings reprising his role. In the game he helps Batman via Batcommunicator to come after Sin Tzu and the other villains and their thugs who escaped from both the Arkham Asylum and the Stonegate Penitentiary. He was also kidnapped by the Scarecrow before being saved by the Dark Knight.
 James Gordon appears in the Batman Begins video game tie-in voiced by Gavin Hammon. Unlike the movie, in the videogame he's already Commissioner and even older than the film's counterpart.
 Commissioner Gordon appears in DC Universe Online, voiced by Ken Webster. He appears as a supporting character for the heroes.
 Commissioner Gordon makes a cameo appearance in Injustice: Gods Among Us. In the opening scene which takes place in an alternate reality, he is seen watching the news about the Joker destroying Metropolis with a nuclear missile. In Batgirl's ending, it was revealed that the alternate version of her father was killed by the Regime for aiding the Insurgency.
 Commissioner Gordon appears as a supporting character in Scribblenauts Unmasked: A DC Comics Adventure.
 Commissioner Gordon appears in Batman: Dark Tomorrow, voiced by Ron McLarty.
 Commissioner Gordon's legacy plays an important role in Gotham Knights, where he has died prior to the game's events, which led to the GCPD becoming corrupt.

Lego series
 Commissioner Gordon appears in Lego Batman: The Video Game for the PlayStation 3, Nintendo DS, Wii, PlayStation 2, PC, and Xbox 360 with his vocal effects are provided by Keith Ferguson. He serves as a boss in the villains' story (with the exception of the DS version) and is a playable character.
 Commissioner Gordon appears in Lego Batman 2: DC Super Heroes, voiced by Townsend Coleman. He is present after Lex Luthor engineered a prison break at Arkham Asylum. Around the end of the video game, Commissioner Gordon is seen when he and his police officers arrest Lex Luthor and Joker.
 The Dark Knight Trilogy iteration of James Gordon appears in Lego Batman 3: Beyond Gotham.
 Commissioner Gordon appears in Lego Dimensions, voiced by Steven Blum. He appears in the DC Comics World where he requires the player's assistance after one of his police officers accidentally blew up a truck full of valuables.
 Commissioner Gordon appears as a playable character in Lego DC Super-Villains, voiced by Tom Kane. At the beginning of the story, he oversees the transfer of the player-created character, dubbed "The Rookie", to Stryker's Island in Metropolis, and enlists the help of an incarcerated Lex Luthor to monitor the new villain's powers, offering him a reduction of his prison sentence in return. However, the prison is then attacked by Luthor's bodyguard Mercy Graves, who frees both Luthor and the Rookie.

Arkham series
Commissioner Gordon is a supporting character in the Batman: Arkham franchise where he is voiced by Tom Kane in Arkham Asylum, Rick D. Wasserman as a young man in a flashback in Arkham Asylum, David Kaye in Arkham City, Michael Gough in Arkham Origins and Jonathan Banks in Arkham Knight.

 In Batman: Arkham Asylum, he is introduced accompanying Batman with the readmission of the recently captured Joker in the beginning of the game. Once Joker breaks free Batman tells Gordon to alert the Warden and goes after Joker. Once Batman follows Joker to the other end of intensive treatment, Joker shows video footage of Frank Boles (a guard working with Joker) taking Gordon hostage. On the way to free Gordon, Batman encounters the Scarecrow dragging Gordon away and apparently kills him. It is later revealed the dead person Batman found earlier was actually a guard who Batman had been seen as Gordon due to Scarecrow's gas. Though Boles is quickly killed once Joker realizes the guard was being tracked by Batman, Harley Quinn keeps Gordon under watch in the medical facility. Batman arrives to stop Harley and frees Gordon, and the pair discover that Bane is also in the facility. After the battle with Bane, Batman sends Gordon on a guard-escorted ferry back to Gotham. Gordon isn't seen again until the end of the game when Batman confronts Joker for the final time. Joker reveals he has re-captured Gordon, who is dropped from the ceiling tied up. Joker aims a dart gun laced with Titan at Gordon and pulls the trigger, but Batman quickly jumps in front of Gordon, taking a hit for him. Joker then uses the Titan on himself. Gordon is later seen on the roof strapped to an electric chair while Titan Joker and Batman (who uses the cure on himself) battle. Once Joker is defeated, Gordon and Batman are quickly joined by multiple members of GCPD and SWAT members. Gordon is talking to his daughter Barbara Gordon (a.k.a. Oracle) about the events that night. Gordon offers a ride home to Batman, considering the Batmobile was destroyed, when an alert on Gordon's radio states that Two-Face has robbed Gotham's second national bank and watches as Batman takes off in the Batwing. It is also mentioned in a Scarecrow-induced flashback that Gordon was the only officer who was sympathetic to the young Bruce Wayne on the night his parents were murdered.
 In Batman: Arkham City, he sends cops led by Sergeant Tom Miller to find out what Arkham City is really about. He appears at the very end of the game, repeatedly asking an unresponsive Batman about what happened within Arkham City while Batman was carrying away the Joker's corpse. Scanning the radio for the GCPD signal shortly after Bruce Wayne's arrest in the game will give the player a sound bit of him telling a dispatcher to inform all officers to take arrests to GCPD instead of Arkham City because as he puts it "Wayne's lawyers will have a field day with this." Gordon also appears in the DLC Harley Quinn's Revenge, being another one of the Dark Knight's allies that is concerned about his mental state since Joker's death.
 In Batman: Arkham Origins, a younger James "Jim" Gordon is featured as a GCPD Captain. Being set eight years before Arkham Asylum, Gordon has yet to forge an alliance with Batman, seeing the Dark Knight as a menace and a lunatic, as opposed to his daughter Barbara Gordon seeing the vigilante as a hero. During Batman's break-in at the GCPD, Batman runs into Gordon while trying to escape and harmlessly disarms him, futilely trying to explain that they're on the same side. After saving Gordon's life when SWAT leader Branden nearly shoots him by accident, he escapes, though Gordon is knocked out in the process. Gordon later appears arresting Joker after the firefight at the Royal Hotel, and later again when he takes control of the police to stop Firefly from demolishing the bridge. When Batman arrives, he refuses to listen to his warnings about the bombs and insists Batman surrender to Firefly. Eventually he sees reason and the bomb squad disables the last bomb, allowing Batman to defeat Firefly. When the Joker takes over Blackgate Prison, Gordon arrives to stop the chaos only for his life to be put in danger when Joker straps him to an electric chair that will go off if Batman does not kill Bane in time. Batman momentarily stops Bane's heart in time to save Gordon, and the two work together to defeat Joker. Though Gordon still feels obligated to arrest Batman, the latter disappears, and Gordon decides the city needs Batman. He later reluctantly requests Batman's help in rounding up several escaped Blackgate prisoners.
 Jim Gordon is featured in Batman: Arkham Origins Blackgate.
 In Batman: Arkham Knight, Gordon loses trust in Batman after Barbara is kidnapped by Scarecrow and Batman revealed that she was working with him. He tries to go after Scarecrow himself, but gets captured and witnesses the confrontation between the Arkham Knight and Batman making him discover that Batman is Bruce Wayne. They confront Scarecrow on the roof of the building where Scarecrow orders Gordon to kill Batman to save Barbara. He shoots Batman, but Crane throws Barbara regardless. However, Gordon shot Batman in the chest piece on purpose (since it has extra armor) and Batman saves Barbara as Gordon is kidnapped by the Scarecrow with Tim Drake. Scarecrow forces Gordon to unmask Batman on live television. When Batman finally defeats Scarecrow, Bruce tells Gordon to look after Tim and Barbara as it is the end for Batman. In the epilogue that takes place one year later, Gordon became the Mayor of Gotham City and goes to his daughter and Tim's wedding. The story pack DLC Batgirl: A Matter of Family, taking place before the events of Arkham Asylum, centers around Gordon being kidnapped and held hostage by Joker and Harley Quinn in a defunct oil rig, as Batgirl and Robin attempt to rescue him.

Telltale's Batman
James "Jim" Gordon appears in Batman: The Telltale Series and Batman: The Enemy Within, voiced by Murphy Guyer.
 In the first season, Lt. Gordon is a reluctant ally of Batman and one of his supports within the GCPD. He is also the officer in charge of the investigation into Thomas Wayne and Martha Kane's connections to organized crime. During the series, he is able to create an alliance between the GCPD and Batman to combat the Children of Arkham, despite objections from the Commissioner, Peter Grogan, and other officers on the force. Gordon can also become associated with Bruce Wayne, depending on options taken by the player, such as giving him a file on Carmine Falcone's empire or helping him arrest the Penguin. At the end of the series, Gordon is promoted to Acting Commissioner after Grogan is killed by either Harvey Dent's enforcers or the Children of Arkham. During his appointment speech, Gordon is supported by either Bruce Wayne or Batman.
 In the second season, The Enemy Within, Gordon has now been given the title of Commissioner permanently and still allied with Batman. When Amanda Waller and her organization the Agency arrive in Gotham, he and the GCPD are forced to cooperate with them and, after a failed operation to capture the Riddler, relinquish law enforcement in Gotham to the Agency. Gordon's relationship with Batman is also tested after he learns about the vigilante's indirect involvement in an attack on Wayne Enterprises and if the vigilante cooperates with the Agency. After attempting to arrest Bruce Wayne for his association with the Pact, Gordon, having been warned by Waller, is fired from the GCPD. During the Joker's attacks on Gotham, Gordon either helps Batman track him down after he kidnaps Waller in Joker's vigilante path or is forced to betray Batman in return for the locations of bombs hidden through Gotham in Joker's villain path only to be crippled by the criminal. Waller states that Gordon won't be able to walk without a cane. During the epilogue of the game, Batman can arrange to either have Gordon reinstated as Commissioner, honored for his choice, or have him retired from law enforcement.

Web series
 James "Jim" Gordon appears in the web series DC Super Hero Girls, voiced by Tom Kenny. He is the forensics teacher at Super Hero High School and the protective father of Barbara Gordon/Batgirl.

Miscellaneous
 Commissioner Gordon is featured in the Smallville Season 11 digital comic based on the TV series.
 In the "Batmobile" OnStar commercial, Batman calls Gordon to tell him he will be coming to meet him. An unknown actor says "Gordon here" when Batman calls.
 In several comics during 1992, such as Action Comics #673, DC ran full-page advertisements on behalf of the American Heart Association showing a picture of Gordon in a hospital bed. The text of the ad explained that Gordon had a heart attack due to stress, poor diet, lack of exercise and tobacco use. Since then, DC has had Gordon living a more healthy lifestyle.
 James Gordon is portrayed by Lauren Lopez in the web-musical, Holy Musical B@man!
 In the Saturday Night Live digital skit "Commissioner Gordon Learns Batman Has No Boundaries", he is portrayed by Steve Buscemi (who was hosting the episode that this sketch was in).

References

External links
 Commissioner James Gordon at DC Comics' official website
 
 

Characters created by Bill Finger
Characters created by Bob Kane
Comics characters introduced in 1939
DC Comics male characters
DC Comics military personnel
DC Comics television characters
Fictional American police detectives
Fictional criminologists
Fictional police captains
Fictional police commissioners
Fictional police lieutenants
Fictional police sergeants
Fictional United States Marine Corps personnel
Fictional special forces personnel
Fictional characters from Chicago
Gotham City Police Department officers
Fictional Chicago Police Department detectives
Male characters in film
Male characters in television
Superhero film characters
Batman characters
DC Animated Universe characters